The following is a list of California Baptist Lancers men's basketball head coaches. There have been 12 head coaches of the Lancers in their 67-season history.

California Baptist's current head coach is Rick Croy. He was hired as the Lancers' head coach in April 2013, replacing Tim Collins, who retired after 2012–13 season.

References

California Baptist

California Baptist Lancers men's basketball coaches